Hyphochytriaceae is a polycentric and endobiotic family in the order of Hyphochytriales.

References

Further reading 
 

Heterokont genera
Pseudofungi